Rainbow Ranch is a ranch home located in Madison, Tennessee. It was listed on the National Register of Historic Places listings in Davidson County, Tennessee (NRHP) in 2018.

History
Canadian American musician Hank Snow lived in the Rainbow Ranch. He died on December 20, 1999 , at his the ranch in Madison, Tennessee. Snow bought the home shortly after he experienced success with two songs, "I've Been Everywhere" and "I'm Movin' On." He named the home 'Rainbow Ranch' after his band, which was known as the "Rainbow Ranch Boys". In recent years the home has been restored by Snow's family.

It was added to the National Register of Historic Places listings in Davidson County, Tennessee on November 27, 2018.

Description
Snow also built a "Rainbow Ranch barn" on the property for his horse Shawnee. The home also features a recording studio.

References

1951 establishments in Tennessee
National Register of Historic Places in Nashville, Tennessee
Houses on the National Register of Historic Places in Tennessee
Buildings and structures in Nashville, Tennessee
Tourist attractions in Tennessee
Tourist attractions in Nashville, Tennessee